Dinarchus or Dinarch (Corinth, c. 361 – c. 291 BC) was a logographer (speechwriter) in Ancient Greece. He was the last of the ten Attic orators included in the "Alexandrian Canon" compiled by Aristophanes of Byzantium and Aristarchus of Samothrace in the third century BC.

Life
A son of Sostratus (or, according to the Suda, Socrates), Dinarchus settled at Athens early in life, and when not more than twenty-five was already active as a logographer—a writer of speeches for the law courts. As a metic, he was unable to take part in the debates. He had been the pupil both of Theophrastus and of Demetrius Phalereus, and had early acquired a certain fluency and versatility of style.

In 324 the Areopagus, after inquiry, reported that nine men had taken bribes from Harpalus, the fugitive treasurer of Alexander. Ten public prosecutors were appointed. Dinarchus wrote, for one or more of these prosecutors, the three speeches which are still extant: Against Demosthenes, Against Aristogeiton, and Against Philocles.

The sympathies of Dinarchus were in favor of an Athenian oligarchy under Macedonian control; but it should be remembered that he was not an Athenian citizen. Aeschines and Demades had no such excuse. In the Harpalus affair, Demosthenes as well as the others accused, were probably innocent. Yet Hypereides, the most fiery of the patriots, was on the same side as Dinarchus.

Under the regency of his old master, Demetrius Phalereus, Dinarchus exercised much political influence. The years 317–307 were the most prosperous of his life. On the fall of Demetrius Phalereus and the restoration of the democracy by Demetrius Poliorcetes, Dinarchus was condemned to death and withdrew into exile at Chalcis in Euboea.

About 292, thanks to his friend Theophrastus, he was able to return to Attica, and took up his abode in the country with a former associate, Proxenus. He afterwards brought an action against Proxenus on the ground that he had robbed him of some money and plate. Dinarchus died at Athens about 291.

Surviving speeches
According to Suidas, Dinarchus wrote 160 speeches; and Dionysius held that, out of 85 extant speeches bearing his name, 58 were genuine: 28 relating to public, 30 to private causes. The surviving speeches mentioned above are:
 Against Demosthenes
 Against Aristogiton
 Against Philocles

Notes

References
 Minor Attic Orators, II, Lycurgus. Dinarchus. Demades. Hyperides, trans. J. O. Burtt, Harvard University Press, Loeb Classical Library, 1954.
 Dinarchus, Hyperides, & Lycurgus, trans. Ian Worthington, Craig Cooper, and Edward M. Harris, University of Texas Press, 2001.

Attic orators
Ancient Corinthians
4th-century BC Greek people
3rd-century BC Greek people
Metics in Classical Athens
Hellenistic Athens
360s BC births
290s BC deaths